II (stylized as ii) is the second studio album by British musical duo Aquilo. It was released on 4 May 2018 through Island Records. ii includes earlier singles released in the EP ii (Side A), in November 2017, and other five new tracks.

Track listing
Note: Track list adapted from Apple Music.

References

2018 albums
Aquilo (band) albums
Island Records albums